Joan Willem Schreuder, Jonkman (23 November 1763 – 17 November 1796) was an officer in the Austrian Army during the French Revolutionary Wars.

Biography
Schreuder was born in Batavia, Dutch East Indies, as the youngest child of Jan Schreuder (1704-1764), former Governor of Ceylon, and Clara Geertruijda de la Haye (1729-1769). His marriage to Countess Johanna Antonetta Catharina Louisa von Ranzow (1769 - 1790) on 22 March 1786 at Schenkenschans awarded him the noble title of Jonkheer and ties with the Habsburg monarchy. The marriage resulted in two children. Schreuder was an officer (Major) in the Austrian army during the French Revolutionary Wars from 1790 up to his death at the Battle of Arcole in 1796.

Career
Schreuder served as a captain in the Austrian Kaiser Infantry Regiment # 1 from 1790 to 1794. He served with his regiment in Dagobert Sigmund von Wurmser's Army of the Upper Rhine, fighting at Bad Bergzabern and Bienwaldmühle on 12 and 20 September 1793. He also fought at the First Battle of Wissembourg on 13 October 1793. Schreuder Jonkman was promoted to major and left the regiment 20 February 1794 to serve on the staff of General-Major Gerhard Rosselmini, the former commander of his regiment.

Schreuder followed Rosselmini during the Montenotte Campaign (10–28 April 1796), the battle of Lodi (10 May 1796), the Battle of Borghetto (30 May 1796) and the Siege of Mantua, where Rosselmini held the citadel until he was reassigned in early August. During the battle of Arcole (15–17 November 1796) Rosselmini commanded one of four brigades in Giovanni Marchese di Provera's Main Body. During these days Schreuder died in action at Belfiore, the circumstances of his death are not recorded. General Rosselmini himself died in Vicenza two days after the battle.

References

 Boycott-Brown, Martin. The Road to Rivoli. London: Cassell & Co., 2001. 
 
 Wrede, Alphons. Geschichte der K. und K. Wehrmacht, Vol. 1. Vienna: L. W. Seidel & Sohn, 1898.
 Schels, J.B. (1829) Die Schlacht bei Arcole, am 15, 16 und 17 November 1796. Oesterreichische Zeitschrift, no. Bd 2.

1763 births
1796 deaths
Dutch military personnel of the French Revolutionary Wars
Austrian Empire military leaders of the French Revolutionary Wars
People from Batavia, Dutch East Indies